Caffe Reggio is a New York City coffeehouse first opened in 1927 at 119 Macdougal Street in the heart of Manhattan's Greenwich Village.

Italian cappuccino was introduced in America by the founder of Caffe Reggio, Domenico Parisi, in the early 1920s. Inside the cafe, against the back wall, there is still the original espresso machine, made in 1902, that Domenico Parisi bought with his savings when he opened the cafe in 1927.

The Caffe Reggio has been featured in many movies, including The Godfather Part II, Next Stop, Greenwich Village, The Kremlin Letter, Shaft, Serpico, The Next Man, In Good Company, Inside Llewyn Davis, The Sun Is Also a Star and others. Caffe Reggio is mentioned in the  Luke Cage season 2 episode "They Reminisce Over You". Many celebrities have been spotted or photographed in this location. In 1959, presidential hopeful John F. Kennedy made a speech outside the coffee shop. In 2010, the cafe was honored with a Village Award by the Greenwich Village Society for Historic Preservation for its status as a beloved and essential part of the neighborhood.

Caffe Reggio has a bench from a palazzo of the Florentine Medici family of Renaissance fame. The bench is not roped-off and guests can sit on it and admire a painting from an artist of the school of Caravaggio.

References

External links

"Photos: Visiting Caffe Reggio, A Timeless Classic In A Changing Greenwich Village" by Jen Carlson, Gothamist, December 8, 2014
Caffee Reggio in films; a photo of Al Pacino  at Caffe Reggio by Annie Leibovitz

Coffeehouses and cafés in the United States
1927 establishments in New York City
Espresso
Drinking establishments in Greenwich Village
Restaurants in Manhattan
Italian-American culture in New York City